Ian Graham Gass, FRS, geologist, was Professor of Earth Sciences and Head of Discipline at the Open University, Milton Keynes and he was President of the IAVCEI (1983–87). He was married to Mary Pearce (1955, one son, one daughter).

At the close of the 1960s, a scientific revolution occurred changing the static Geology into a dynamic Earth Science. By showing that the Troödos Mountains, Cyprus is a remnant of seafloor spreading, Ian Gass collaborated in that transformation.

He was educated at the University of Leeds under Prof William Quarrier Kennedy FRS FRSE.

Selected publications

References

Further reading 
Obituary: Professor Ian Gass

Fellows of the Royal Society
1926 births
1992 deaths
British volcanologists
Petrologists
20th-century British geologists